Windsor Park Historic District is a historic district in Brunswick, Georgia, that is listed on the National Register of Historic Places.  It is the area bounded by Lanier Blvd., Walnut Ave., Gloucester St. and Magnolia St.

See also
National Register of Historic Places listings in Glynn County, Georgia

References

 City of Brunswick, Georgia - Community Agenda

External links

Brunswick, Georgia
Historic districts on the National Register of Historic Places in Georgia (U.S. state)
National Register of Historic Places in Glynn County, Georgia